The Legal Resources Centre (LRC) is a human rights organisation based in South Africa with offices in Johannesburg (including a Constitutional Litigation Unit), Cape Town, Durban and Grahamstown. It was founded in 1979 by a group of prominent South African lawyers, including Arthur Chaskalson, Felicia Kentridge, and Geoff Budlender, under the guidance of American civil rights lawyers Jack Greenberg and Michael Meltsner, then Director-Counsel and former First Assistant Counsel of the NAACP Legal Defense and Educational Fund respectively.

The LRC is a generalist public interest law firm that engages in litigation and other activities across a wide range of focus areas, including the full range of rights in the Constitution of South Africa. The LRC has litigated many of South Africa's landmark human rights cases since its establishment, including major cases resisting apartheid injustices and cases under the new Constitution after 1994. These include S v Makwanyane (abolishing the death penalty), Government of the Republic of South Africa v Grootboom  (establishing the justiciability of socio-economic rights), the Treatment Action Campaign case (compelling government to provide anti-retroviral drugs to prevent transmission of HIV at childbirth) and the silicosis class action (South Africa's largest class action, against the major players in the gold mining industry, culminating in a multi-billion Rand settlement to compensate black mineworkers).

The LRC has produced more judges than any other law firm or public interest law centre, all appointed after 1994. They include the first head of the newly created Constitutional Court, Arthur Chaskalson, and the former President of the Supreme Court of Appeal, Lex Mpati, as well as many others.

Notable alumni

 George Bizos, human rights advocate
Jason Brickhill, human rights advocate and academic
 Arthur Chaskalson, former Chief Justice and Constitutional Court judge
 John Hlophe, Judge President of the Western Cape Division of the High Court
 Felicia Kentridge, human rights advocate and wife of leading anti-apartheid lawyer Sydney Kentridge
Janet Love, former National Director of the LRC, former Commissioner of the South African Human Rights Commission, Commissioner of the Independent Electoral Commission and former member of uMkhonto weSizwe, armed wing of the ANC
 Bongani Christopher Majola, former Assistant Secretary-General of the United Nations International Criminal Tribunal for Rwanda
 Dunstan Mlambo, Judge President of the Gauteng Division of the High Court
Lex Mpati, former President of the Supreme Court of Appeal
Mahomed Navsa, judge of the Supreme Court of Appeal
 Sandile Ngcobo, Chief Justice and Constitutional Court judge
 Chris Nicholson, judge in the KwaZulu-Natal Provincial Division of the High Court
Tembeka Ngcukaitobi, human rights advocate and author
Thandi Orleyn, corporate executive, former head of Commission for Conciliation, Mediation & Arbitration (CCMA), Chair of Legal Resources Trust

References

External links

Law firms of South Africa
Organizations established in 1979